The UHY Center is a 4,000-seat multi-purpose arena in Loudonville, New York. It was built in 1974 and is home to the Siena College Saints women's basketball team and women's volleyball team. It used to host the men's team until MVP Arena opened in 1990.

See also
 List of NCAA Division I basketball arenas

External links
Facility information

College basketball venues in the United States
College volleyball venues in the United States
Indoor arenas in New York (state)
Siena Saints men's basketball
1974 establishments in New York (state)
Sports venues completed in 1974
Basketball venues in New York (state)
Sports venues in Albany County, New York